The Women 49er FX is a sailing event on the Sailing at the 2020 Summer Olympics program in Tokyo and took place between 27 July – 3 August. The defending champions, Martine Grael and Kahena Kunze from Brazil, won the event. Tina Lutz and Susann Beucke from Germany were the second, and Annemiek Bekkering and Annette Duetz from the Netherlands won the bronze medal. For Lutz, Beucke, Bekkring, and Duetz this was the first Olympic medal.

The medal race was originally scheduled for 2 August, but had to be postponed due to the lack of wind. Before the medal race, which costs twice as many points as every other race, Grael and Kunze were tied with Bekkering and Duetz for the first place, and Lutz and Beucke were in the third position. The medal race was won by Argentinians Victoria Travascio and María Sol Branz, which did not help them to move to a medal position. However, Duetz and Bekkering, who only managed to finish ninth out of ten competitors, moved to the third place, while Lutz and Beuke, who finished fifth, received the silver medal.

The medals were presented by IOC Member for Spain, Mr Juan Antonio Samaranch Jnr. (son of former Olympic President Juan Antonio Samaranch) and World Sailing President Li Quanhai.

Schedule

Results

References

Women's 49erFX
49er FX
Women's events at the 2020 Summer Olympics
Olym